Frank J. Stevenson (1922-2015) was an American agricultural scientist who made large contributions to the scientific agricultural community breakthroughs regarding soil and its relationship with Natural Organic Materials (NOM) and Humic Substances (HS). For a large period of time in the field he was considered one of the most leading researchers in regards to the two substances NOM and HS.

Early life 
Frank J. Stevenson was born August 2, 1922 in Logan, Utah and sought a formal primary education in Salt Lake City, Utah. He started his post secondary education at the University of Utah but joined the U.S war efforts as he applied for the navy as an airman. before seeing live action in the Iowa Jima campaign he received his training at Pensacola, Florida. During the Iowa Jima campaign he was a pilot who was shot down. After the war he returned to mainland USA and continued his education where he obtained his bachelor of science degree.

Scientific work 
Stevenson was involved with research utilizing humic chemistry and concepts regarding how humic chemistry interacts with earth metals found within our soil. it is because of this work that he was recognize as one of the first major contributing scientist to discover and further map out organic materials within our soil which has been implemented and substantially benefited agricultural settings. It is with his work along with fellow scientist Dr. Morris Schnitzer that aided in the understandings of the impacts of chemicals and nutrients within the earth soil. With their work being fundamentally important with regards to understanding soil and environmental functions, Schnitzer and Stevenson were both awarded the Wolf Prize Laureate in Agriculture in 1995. He was also made an honorary member of the International Humic Substance Society, other wise known as the IHSS along with his counterpart Dr. Schnitzer as their work was seen to be groundbreaking to the research community.

References 

Wikipedia Student Program
1922 births

2015 deaths
Scientists from Logan, Utah
20th-century American scientists
University of Utah people